Edwin Lockwood (September 8, 1799 – October 14, 1878) was Warden of the Borough of Norwalk, Connecticut from 1865 to 1867 and from 1869 to 1870.

Early life and family
He was born in Norwalk on September 8, 1799, the son of Ebenezer and Mary Godfrey Lockwoood.

He married twice, first to Emily Ives Lockwood on October 10, 1829, but she died in 1830. Together they had one daughter Emily, who died before twelve years of age. He next married Emily Olmstead on August 2, 1832. Together they had seven children. However, only one lived to adulthood.

He was the uncle of LeGrand Lockwood.

Career
In 1862, he founded the Norwalk Horse Railway Company and served as its president.

References

1799 births
1878 deaths
Burials in Mill Hill Burying Ground
American railway entrepreneurs
Mayors of Norwalk, Connecticut
19th-century American politicians
19th-century American businesspeople